Kere Thonnur is a small village in Mandya district of Karnataka state, India.

Location

Tourist attractions
Kere Thonnur is a well-known tourist spot because of its green paddy fields, ancient temples and the twin lakes.  Many Kannada films were shot in this village and the adjacent village of Shingapoore.
Keretannur lake is famous

See also
 Narayanapura
 Shingapoore
 Pandavapura

Image gallery

References

Villages in Mandya district